Firuzeh (also Romanized as Fīrūzeh) is a village in Aladagh Rural District, in the Central District of Bojnord County, North Khorasan Province, Iran. At the 2006 census, its population was 393, in 99 families.

References 

Populated places in Bojnord County